Shabolovskaya (also known as Шаболовка (English: Shabolovka street)) is a station on the Kaluzhsko-Rizhskaya Line of the Moscow Metro. Though the station itself was built along with the rest of the Kaluzhskaya Line in 1962, problems with the escalator shaft postponed its opening until November 6, 1980. During the 18 intervening years the appearance of the platform was modernized, so it does not appear similar to the other 1960s stations on the line.

Shabolovskaya has pylons punctuated on all four faces by projecting piers and faced with white marble. The piers on the transverse faces of the pylons extend upward into the vaulted ceiling. The outer walls are clad in incongruously dark corrugated metal, which contrasts sharply with the bright white of the ceiling and pylons. At the end of the platform is a backlit stained glass panel on the theme of radio and television broadcasting. The station was designed by I.G. Petukhova, V.P. Kachurinets, N.I. Demchinsky, and Yu.A. Kolesnikova.

Shabolovskaya's entrance vestibule is on Shabolovka street south of the intersection with Academicial Petrovsky street.

Image and video gallery

Moscow Metro stations
Railway stations in Russia opened in 1980
Kaluzhsko-Rizhskaya Line
1980 establishments in the Soviet Union
Articles containing video clips
Railway stations located underground in Russia